Gaebyeok (the "great opening", literally "opening dawn") is a sudden change in nature, society and people in the Korean religion of Jeungism or Jeung San Do.

Gaebyeok can mean a dramatic change within a person, such as a transformation in one's physical condition or a sudden spiritual awakening, or gaebyeok can refer to a transformation in society.

Etymology
Both syllables, gae (開) and byuk (闢), mean "to open." The word comes from the Sino-Korean phrase cheon-ji-gae-byeok (天地開闢), which means "heaven opens and earth opens."

Mythos

Throughout a Cosmic year there are major gaebyeoks and minor gaebyeoks. Every Cosmic month (10,800 years) there is a minor gaebyeok accompanied by a minor but sudden shift of the Earth's axis. Every Cosmic season (20,000-50,000 years) there is a major gaebyeok with a more dramatic shift in the Earth's axis.

See also
 Boeun (Offering Gratitude and Repayment) 報恩
 Cosmic Year
 Shao Yung
 Dojang Dao center 道場
 Dojeon Sacred text of Jeung San Do 道典
 Haewon (Resolution of Bitterness and Grief) 解怨
 Jeung San Do
 Sangjenim 上帝
 Sangsaeng (Mutual life-giving) 相生
 Tae Eul Ju mantra 太乙呪
 Taemonim 太母
 Wonsibanbon (Returning to the Origin) 原始反本

References

Jeung San Do
Apocalypticism